The underscore  is a typographic element.

Underscore, underline or _ may also refer to:
 Macron below, a diacritic accent
 Underscore (dance), a practice in contact improvisation developed by Nancy Stark Smith
 Underscore Records Pvt. Ltd., an Indian record label
 Underscore.js, a JavaScript library providing utility functions for common programming tasks
 Underscoring, a technique in musical theatre
 _ (album), a 2016 album by BT

See also
 Macron (disambiguation)
 Strikethrough
 Bar (diacritic)
 Overline or overscore or overbar